Celio González (January 29, 1924 – 2004) was a Cuban musician. He was a notable singer from the Sonora Matancera.

References 

Cuban musicians
1924 births
2004 deaths